Stephen Herrero is a Canadian professor emeritus of ecology at the University of Calgary. He is the author of Bear Attacks: Their Causes and Avoidance, which has been described as "authoritative" and "required reading" on the topic.

Herrero was born in San Francisco, and earned his Ph.D. from University of California, Berkeley in animal behaviour and ecology. He moved to Canada after becoming disillusioned with overdevelopment in the U.S., and the Vietnam War.

As a professor at the University of Calgary, Herrero's research on bear attacks has been highly influential; it helped develop new policies in bear safety and shifted focus to bear conservation. He is described as a leading authority on bear attacks and safety, produces bear safety videos, and testifies in legal proceedings involving bear attacks.

He was a consultant on the 1978 National Film Board documentary, Bears and Man.

See also 
 Bear attack
 List of fatal bear attacks in North America

References

 

Living people
People from San Francisco
University of California, Berkeley alumni
Academic staff of the University of Calgary
Ethologists
American expatriate academics
American expatriates in Canada
Educators from California
Year of birth missing (living people)